Ranendranath Sen (September 23, 1909 – November 13, 2003) was an Indian communist politician and trade unionist. He was the president of All India Trade Union Congress from 1973 to 1976. He was member of 3rd Lok Sabha, 4th Lok Sabha and 5th Lok Sabha from Barasat constituency. He elected to West Bengal Legislative Assembly in 1952 and 1957 from Maniktala Assembly constituency. He previously associated with National Revolutionary Movement in undivided Bengal-Jugantar Party.

Position Held
Licentiate of Medical Faculty, National Medical Institute, Calcutta; President,
 Bengal Provincial Trade Union Congress; Vice-President
Member, National Council of the Communist Party of India

References

Communist Party of India politicians from West Bengal
Lok Sabha members from West Bengal
India MPs 1962–1967
India MPs 1967–1970
India MPs 1971–1977
West Bengal MLAs 1951–1957
West Bengal MLAs 1957–1962